The 1983 Wyoming Cowboys football team represented the University of Wyoming as a member of the Western Athletic Conference (WAC) during the 1983 NCAA Division I-A football season. Led by third-year head coach Al Kincaid, the Cowboys compiled a record of 7–5 overall and 5–3 in conference play, placing third in the WAC. The team played home games at War Memorial Stadium in Laramie, Wyoming.

Schedule

References

Wyoming
Wyoming Cowboys football seasons
Wyoming Cowboys football